Salvation Run is a seven-issue 2007-2008 DC Comics limited series which was designed to tie into the company's major event series Final Crisis in 2008.

Premise
The premise of the series, which is based on a pitch by George R. R. Martin, is that the majority of the DC Universe's supervillains—both major ones (such as Lex Luthor and the Joker) and newer or more obscure ones (such as Scandal Savage and Crazy Quilt) -- have been captured by the Suicide Squad and imprisoned on a distant planet. The story features the villains splitting into alliances and trying to find a way to escape their prison, or choosing to rule the planet "Salvation" on which they have landed. Bill Willingham started as writer, but had to hand the project over to Sturges after only three issues (of seven proposed) because of illness. The first issue was released in November 2007.

Major characters in the mini-series include Superman's archenemy Lex Luthor, Batman's archenemy the Joker, the "Rogues" who typically battle the Flash (Heat Wave, Captain Cold, Weather Wizard, Abra Kadabra and Mirror Master), and other morally ambiguous heroes such as Vandal Savage's daughter Scandal Savage and Batman's occasional lover Catwoman. Tie-ins to the series have occurred in Countdown to Final Crisis (which details Piper and Trickster's continual evasion of capture), Outsiders, Checkmate, Catwoman, and Justice League of America.

A compiled paperback version of this mini-series was released on September 24, 2008.

Plot
Following the events of Black Adam's rampage in World War III, the Amazonian attack on the United States, the murder of the Flash (Bart Allen), and the Injustice League's attack upon the wedding of Green Arrow and Black Canary, a U.S. government sponsored secret program is put in place to combat the growing metahuman threat. Initiated by Executive Order by the President of the United States and carried out by head of Task Force X, Amanda Waller, and the Suicide Squad, the purpose of the program is to capture the supervillains of the world and permanently exile them to the distant planet Salvation via Boom Tube—including several Suicide Squad members once they are no longer needed (examples being Bane and Deadshot). According to Flag, the prisoners would not be getting any supplies or equipment for their survival, as that would make the government responsible for them, and once they're offworld, they are no longer Earth's responsibility. The planet chosen was Cygnus 4019, a planet that was supposed to be peaceful. However, it turned out to be a "training planet" for the New Gods of Apokolips with Desaad watching the goings-on. One tie-in issue contradicted this information; the Justice League of America visited Cygnus 4019 to investigate, only to find the planet deserted—the villains had been diverted by Boom Tube to a different planet.

Having arrived on the planet first, the Flash's Rogues (Abra Kadabra, Captain Cold, Heat Wave, Mirror Master, and Weather Wizard) are the first to find out that the planet is seemingly designed to kill any visitors. The planet is inhabited by numerous hazardous species which constantly attack. When it came to the local pygmies, Abra Kadabra realizes they are intelligent and is able to decipher the pygmies' language enough to learn of the "Safe Zone", a "miles long district where all of the dangers have been disarmed by gods from the stars" and the Rogues set out to find it. During their journey, they hear a second Boom Tube arrive and decide to go back. Out of the Boom Tubes come Black Spider III, Cheetah III, Clayface I, Effigy, Girder, Hammer and Sickle, a Hyena, Joker, Kid Karnevil, Killer Croc, Killer Frost II, Mammoth, Mr. Freeze, Mister Terrible, Phobia, Psimon, Rock, Shimmer, Shrapnel, Sonar II, Tapeworm, and Tremor (of the Superior Five). For a short time, they attempt to assert their leadership over the second group by virtue of their experience.

The Body Doubles, Hellhound, Iron Cross, Manticore, Meanstreak, Metallo, Rag Doll, Skorpio, and Tar Pit end up in a fight with some wild robotic beasts during which Hellhound is wounded. Despite their plans to leave him to die, the other villains bring Hellhound along, only to feed him to a hunting party of four "lion-lizards". Back at camp, Kid Karnevil tells The Joker that he has looked up to him and plans to surpass him by slaying him when he least suspects it. Psimon loudly orates to the entire group that he has figured out a way for them to survive as a society, and even build a civilization that will last many generations, requiring that the women be used as baby factories, and that escape from the planet be given up as an option. This is met with loud disdain from many others, especially the women. Joker then unexpectedly walks up to him and kills him by violently bashing his head in with a rock. At Belle Reve, the Suicide Squad is about to deport Lex Luthor, Blockbuster, and Catwoman. Rick Flag Jr. closes the transportational Boom Tube with Bane, Chemo, and Deadshot still inside and tells the two that they are no longer needed on the Suicide Squad. After Flag states that he's too unstable to remain, Deadshot vows to somehow return to Earth and kill Rick Flag Jr. Once on the planet, Lex Luthor immediately commands the attention of the entire supervillain body, saying that he intends to lead them. He makes a speech about Truth, Justice and the American Way, and explains how they have to build their own Boom Tube if they want to get back, at which time they can murder all of those who sent them to the planet. Although at first some villains jeer him, by the end they are all riled up and cheering for his plans.

The villains are already fighting heavily amongst themselves, with very few mediators. Lex Luthor announces to the group that he, Doctor Sivana, Professor Ivo and General Immortus have devised a way to get them off the rock. As he's orating, The Joker loudly voices his distrust for Luthor as a leader, annoyed that he expects everybody else to listen when he hasn't even told them his plan. Joker questions why they should accept any authority there, when they didn't accept it back on Earth. While they're arguing, a new burrowing kraken-like monster attacks the camp, and Joker and Gorilla Grodd use Chemo to destroy it. Joker proclaims himself to be a humble hero of the people and further denounces Luthor, likening him to aristocracy. A bigger fight starts to break out in the camp between those who are working and those who aren't, which escalates until Iron Cross physically threatens the Joker as an endangerment to the camp. Joker shoots him in the head, killing him, and announces that he and Grodd are having a mutiny. Soon, those loyal to Luthor and those who prefer Joker have a massive battle, razing most of the camp in the process. Deciding it's getting out of hand, Gorilla Grodd uses his telepathic powers to calm everybody down, and he and the Joker leave the camp to make it on their own elsewhere with all those loyal to them. They take a very sizable portion of the camp with them. As they're leaving, Doctor Sivana angrily complains to Lex Luthor about their situation. Luthor explains that knowing there would be a mutiny, he had asked Iron Cross to threaten Joker. His plan, which he believes was incredibly successful, was to simultaneously get rid of all of the worthless members of the camp who would sit around and squander resources, and create a common enemy as a motivational tool that those remaining loyal to him would have to fight against. After the chaos, Blockbuster III leaves the camp for an empty clearing in the middle of the woods and reverts into Martian Manhunter. He reveals he has been sent to observe the villains and is reporting to an unknown party on a communicator.

Catwoman spies on Martian Manhunter in the woods, learning his secrets. Martian Manhunter is revealed to be reporting back to Batman with his communicator, although he doesn't know if Batman can pick up the signal from that far away. Lex Luthor is still having to soothe tensions in his camp, this time between the Body Doubles and ex-Suicide Squad members Bane and Deadshot. His camp distrusts them because of the role they played in the Salvation deportation, but to show he trusts them, Lex Luthor hires Deadshot and Bane on as his personal security detail, offering them one million dollars apiece when they get back to Earth. Tensions are even higher in Joker's camp as Joker is proving to be an irresponsible and ineffective, if fearsome, leader. He is attacked by Bolt, angry at the lack of food their camp has, but the minor insurrection is stopped by Kid Karnevil. Brain and Monsieur Mallah arrive at Joker's camp, and Monsieur Mallah asks Grodd to speak with him away from the others. Mallah proposes to Grodd that as fellow gorillas, the natural kings of the jungle, they should team up, since surely through their combined might they would be able to rule the entire place by themselves. Grodd laughs at Mallah for considering himself, an "absurd science experiment", comparable to "a proud child of Gorilla City". Monsieur Mallah strikes Gorilla Grodd and calls him a beast, causing Grodd to fly into a rage and try to kill him. Although Mallah has a gun and shoots Grodd several times, Grodd still has the upper hand, and is about to kill Mallah when Brain interjects, pleading for Mallah's life. Thinking better of it, Grodd picks Brain up and beats Mallah to death with Brain, smashing Brain's protective hull in the process and killing him as well. Before breathing his last breath, Mallah says he dies happy, taking solace in that he and Brain will finally be able to be together forever. Shortly afterwards, after admiring his handiwork and admitting his respect for Grodd, Joker pushes the fatigued Grodd off of a cliff into a very deep and rocky chasm because he hates "sharing". Afterwards, on a separate part of the planet, Vandal Savage and four other ladies are walking through the wilderness alone. Vandal explains why he believes the respective camps of Luthor and Joker will both fail and collapse in on themselves, and then shows the ladies he has brought them to the rumored "Safe Zone", a beautiful-looking paradise, as they reach the top of a hill.

Joker leads his group on a night-time raid on "Camp Luthor" in search of supplies. During the raid, Catwoman is discovered sneaking around in trees, bringing suspicion upon herself as a "good guy" spy. To prove her innocence and shift the heat, she outs "Blockbuster" as Martian Manhunter, having seen him change earlier. This results in the rest of the villains quickly turning their attention to him and bringing him down. Upon the discovery of the villains on this planet, Desaad plans to weed out the less-powerful villains and train the better ones for an unclear goal.

One week later, Heat Wave is shown holding Martian Manhunter in a fiery cage. Captain Cold, Hyena, and Killer Croc talk about what to do with Martian Manhunter. When Killer Croc suggests eating him, Captain Cold and Heat Wave object to this. Lex Luthor tells them not to lay a finger on the Manhunter. Later, Thunder and Lightning arrive to give food to Martian Manhunter. When they offer to help Martian Manhunter, Bane attacks. Despite being shocked by Lightning, Bane defeats both of them as Lex Luthor arrives. As tensions heat up, the Joker begins to argue with and satirize Lex Luthor's leadership, leading them into a heated conflict. After Luthor severely berates and provokes the Joker who backhand slaps him across the face. In Vandal Savage's camp, tensions grow between Savage and the four ladies he has brought with him, each of whom he has promised a position of royalty in his proposed new utopian kingdom as his queen. The ladies, while growing disgruntled, appear to be unaware of the promises he's made to the others. Back in the main camp, Luthor and the Joker prepare to finally have a fistfight between them, an all-out brawl to determine which one will retain supremacy. The fight is long and bloody, and although Luthor arguably gets in more hits, the Joker finally wins due to his bizarre complete tolerance for pain. As the fight ends, it is revealed that while all of the border guards had been watching the melee, not only have an alarming number of the planet's bizarre robot protectors resurfaced, but there is also a gigantic invasion of incoming Parademons by Boom Tube. Upon their attack, a Parademon kills Hyena.

As the Parademon attack continues, one of them stabs Brutale. The villains manage to defeat the Parademons, but Lex Luthor correctly surmises this to be just the first wave. Catwoman informs Lex Luthor about Vandal Savage's camp and leads them to it. Luthor convinces Vandal to help complete the teleportation device and return them all home. Gorilla Grodd (having survived the fall and working with Vandal Savage) rejoins the group and attempts to murder Joker for his attempt to kill him. They are interrupted by another Parademon patrol who are quickly defeated after some of them do away with General Immortus and Solomon Grundy. With the machine finished, the villains return to Earth. Luthor leaves last, revealing that he used Heatmonger (of the Aryan Brigade), Thunder and Lightning, Plasmus, Neutron and Warp to power it. Before leaving, he tells the Parademons "I win! Do you hear me? I BEAT YOU! ALL OF YOU!" Upon his departure, the teleporter explodes, killing the Parademons. The story closes with Captain Cold narrating the mentality of the villains, and of how they're willing to do what it takes to survive. The view then shifts around the planet, taking in the destruction of the Safe Zone and the burning ruins of the camp.

Inmates
Villains placed on the planet include:

Casualties
The following are those who have died in this storyline in order of issue:
 Hellhound (Jack Chifford) - Fed to "lion-lizard" creatures by the Body Doubles.
 Psimon - Bludgeoned to death by a rock used by the Joker.
 Iron Cross (of the Aryan Brigade) - Shot through the head by the Joker.
 Brain - Beaten to death by Gorilla Grodd.
 Monsieur Mallah - Beaten to death by Gorilla Grodd using the remains of Brain's jar.
 Metallo - Burned through by Martian Manhunter's eye blasts. Suffers the blue screen of death.
 Hyena - Shot in the head by a Parademon.
 Brutale - Stabbed by a Parademon.
 General Immortus - Killed at the start of the Parademons' second attack.
 Neutron - Presumably killed when Luthor's teleporter self-destructed.
 Plasmus - Presumably killed when Luthor's teleporter self-destructed.
 Heatmonger (of the Aryan Brigade) - Presumably killed when Luthor's teleporter self-destructed.
 Thunder and Lightning - Presumably killed when Luthor's teleporter self-destructed.
 Warp - Presumably killed when Luthor's teleporter self-destructed.

Solomon Grundy was also killed in Salvation Run #7. His abilities will allow him to be reborn, but his corpse was left on the planet after the final Boom Tube exploded.

Aftermath
In Justice League of America #21, it is revealed that Martian Manhunter was still imprisoned in his flame cage when the villains left the planet. He is soon released however when Libra summons a boom tube for him at the behest of the Human Flame (as depicted in Final Crisis).

Metallo later pops up in Libra's Secret Society of Super Villains presumably rebuilt. Brutale popped up in the recent Secret Six miniseries. General Immortus later appeared alive in Final Crisis Aftermath: Run, but made reference to his seeming demise as a near-death experience.

Collected editions
The series has been collected into a trade paperback:
 Salvation Run (192 pages, September 2008, Titan Books, November 2008)

References

External links
 Review of Salvation Run #1, 1, 3, 5 and 6, Comics Bulletin
 Review of Salvation Run #5, Comic Book Resources
 
 

2007 comics debuts